Llandygái (also Llandegai) is a small village and community on the A5 road between Bangor and Tal-y-bont in Gwynedd, Wales. It affords a view of the nearby Carneddau mountain range. The population of the community taken at the 2011 Census was 2,487. Llandygái community includes nearby Tregarth and Mynydd Llandygái and also the pass of Nant Ffrancon.

Prehistory
There is evidence of human occupation of this site from Neolithic times.

Excavations in the 1960s at the site of the current Industrial Estate uncovered two large henge monuments and  a series of hengiform pit circles from the late Neolithic period. Excavations in 2006 and 2007 at the Bryn Cegin site (extending the industrial estate) found an early Neolithic house and later, possibly Romano-British, settlement

History

In 1648 during the English Civil War the Battle of Y Dalar Hir was fought near Llandygái. Royalist forces of 150 horse and 120 foot soldiers led by Sir John Owen engaged Parliamentarian forces led by Colonel Carter and Colonel George Twistleton.

The village of Llandygái is recorded at the beginning of the nineteenth century as consisting of eight or nine houses. The village was later developed by quarry owner The 1st Baron Penrhyn (1800-1886) as a ‘model village’ for his estate workers, in which ‘no corrupting alehouse’ was permitted. Lord Penrhyn, a Scottish aristocrat, had inherited the Penrhyn Estate from his father-in-law, George Hay Dawkins-Pennant (1764-1840), in 1840.

This model village was mostly constructed in the 1840s in a ‘vernacular revival’ style which conformed to the Picturesque ideal.  The model village was built within the loop of the road to Conwy from where it branched off Telford’s newly built Holyhead to London road.  Each house was built in a similar style but none was to be identical. They were furnished with ample gardens and the layout was such that no house’s front door faced another.

Llandygái Church 

A church was founded by Saint Tegai (or Tygái or simply Cai) in the fifth century. Relics of the Saint, including a stone coffin and a cross bearing his name, are kept at the church.

The church is of cruciform structure with a central tower. It is a Grade II* listed building.

The church has six bells. The bells naturally sound very loud inside the ringing chamber (from where the bells are rung); to combat this the bells are permanently fitted with leather muffles on both sides of the clapper. When ringing the bells they have a strange sound because of this; almost as if they are ringing inside a large tank of water.

In the church is a marble monument to Archbishop John Williams, the Lord Keeper of the Great Seal during the reign of James I. There is also monument by Richard Westmacott to the first Lord Penrhyn, in which the sarcophagus is flanked by a  quarryman and peasant woman, described by Eric Hobsbawm as "the earliest sculpted proletarians".Christopher Bethell, Bishop of Bangor, is buried in the churchyard.

The ecclesiastical parish of Llandygái follows the Ogwen valley southwards, giving its name also to the village of Mynydd Llandygái.

Education
There are accounts of schooling for twelve children under the Welsh Trust in the late seventeenth century, and later a circulating school established in the area in 1750. Shortly after her husband's death, the first Lady Penrhyn set up a school for girls in the village in what is now Neuadd Talgai.  A school for boys was built in 1843.

The boys school, now with a twentieth century extension, forms the present-day primary school, Ysgol Llandygái. It is a Voluntary Controlled school with around 170 pupils.

The village today
The model village, within the loop of the former line of the A55 road, retains much of its original character, despite some more recent additions, having been declared a conservation area in 1974. The village is next to the Grand Lodge affording the principal entrance to Penrhyn Castle, the former seat of the Penrhyn family, now a National Trust property open to the public.

Outside the model village are also to be found –

 Off the A5 towards Bangor:
 Llandygái Gypsy Site
 Llandygái Industrial Estate
 Ty Newydd probation hostel
 Bangor Cricket Club (Ty Newydd ground) 
 Off the A5 towards Bethesda:
 Parc Cegin business park (in development)
 Off the former line of the A5, now a narrow lane:
 Bangor Rugby Football Club

The Holyhead to Chester railway passes by the village through the Llandygái Tunnel, which is 442 yards in length, before emerging onto the Ogwen Viaduct to the east of the village.

Spelling
The village name has been spelt also as Llandegai. The correct Welsh spelling is Llandygái, the accent signifying that the last syllable is stressed as opposed to the last-but-one, the usual pattern. Llandygai is also used an alternative spelling.

See also
 Arllechwedd (electoral ward)

References

External links

 www.geograph.co.uk : photos of Llandygai and surrounding area
 Archaeology at Parc Bryn Cegin
 Village School
 Llandygai Church

Llandygai
Gwynedd